Ali Ahmadi (born 1 March 1994) is an Iranian professional footballer who plays for Nirooye Zamini in the League 2 (Iran).

Club career statistics 

Last Update: 30 June 2021

References

1994 births
Living people
People from Lorestan Province
Iranian footballers
Association football defenders
Sepahan S.C. footballers
Saba players
Sepahan Novin players
Naft Masjed Soleyman F.C. players
Niroye Zamini players
Persian Gulf Pro League players
Azadegan League players
Iranian expatriate footballers
Iranian expatriate sportspeople in Italy
Expatriate footballers in Italy